Cryptandromyces is a genus of fungi in the family Laboulbeniaceae. The genus contains 13 or 19 species.

References

External links
Cryptandromyces at Index Fungorum

Laboulbeniales genera
Laboulbeniaceae